The Sanremo Music Festival 2014 (64° Festival della Canzone Italiana di Sanremo 2014) was the 64th annual Sanremo Music Festival, a televised song contest held at the Teatro Ariston in Sanremo, Liguria, between 18 and 22 February 2014 and broadcast by Rai 1.
Fabio Fazio and Italian comedy actress Luciana Littizzetto presented the show, which was based on the same rules adopted for the previous contest. Competing artists were split in two different sections—Big Artists and Newcomers. The Big Artists section included 14 established Italian artists. During the first and the second night of the show, each act performed two songs, and only one song per act was allowed to continue the competition, as a result of votes received by public and journalists. After the third night, Riccardo Sinigallia's entry, "Prima di andare via", was disqualified for being performed during a concert preceding the competition. During the final night, Arisa's "Controvento" was announced as the winning song for the Big Artists section of the contest.
The Newcomers' section featured eight songs performed by debuting or little known artists. The winning entry, Rocco Hunt's "Nu juorno buono", was announced during the semi-final of the contest.

For the first time since Italy returned to compete in the Eurovision Song Contest in 2011, the Sanremo Music Festival was not used as a selection for the Italian entry at the European contest.

The show featured guests including Luciano Ligabue, Cat Stevens, Damien Rice, Paolo Nutini, Stromae, Gino Paoli, Raffaella Carrà, Laetitia Casta and Rufus Wainwright. Despite this, it received significantly lower ratings than the previous edition, with the final receiving the lowest share percentage since the introduction of Auditel measurements in 1989.

Presenters and personnel

Following the success of the Sanremo Music Festival 2013, since May of the same year, negotiations started to confirm Fabio Fazio and Luciana Littizzetto as the presenters for the contest in 2014. In September 2013, Fazio confirmed he would present the 64th Sanremo Music Festival, during an interview released to Italian newspaper Il Messaggero. A few days later, he confirmed Littizzetto as his co-presenter.

Mauro Pagani was later confirmed as the music director of the show. He also conducted the Sanremo Festival Orchestra during the contest. The scenography was created by Emanuela Trixie Zitkowsky, while Duccio Forzano was the television director of the show, as in 2013.

Italian television presenter Pif was also involved in the Sanremo Music Festival, presenting a 10-minutes pre-show titled Sanremo & Sanromolo.

Selections

Newcomers' section
The selection process for the acts competing in the Newcomers' section included two different contests–Area Sanremo, which served to choose two of the eight entries for the contest, and Sanremo Giovani, a contest which selected six acts for the main competition.

Area Sanremo
Area Sanremo is a contest patrolled by the Comune di Sanremo. The 2013 edition was launched in October, and featured three days of lectures organized by Bruno Santori, followed by internal auditions. 323 acts entered the Area Sanremo competition. On 15 November 2014, the number of acts was reduced to 40 by a commission composed of singer-songwriters Ron and Omar Pedrini, and rapper Dargen D'Amico. The 8 winners of the contest—Lavinia Desideri, Le Gemelle Fontana, Bianca (pseudonym for Emma Fuggetta), Stefano Gelmini, Antonio Pirozzi, Juli (pseudonym for Giulia Saguatti), NaElia (pseudonym for Eliana Antonia Tumminelli) and Vadim (pseudonym for Vadim Valenti)—were announced on 11 December 2013. Among them, Vadim and Bianca were selected on 12 December 2013 by the artistic commission of the Sanremo Music Festival to become the first two confirmed acts of the 64th Sanremo Music Festival. During the same day, their songs, "La modernità" and "Saprei", respectively, were made available on RAI's website.

Sanremo Giovani
The remaining six contestants of the contest were directly selected by RAI through a different contest. Among the applications, 60 songs were pre-selected on 5 December 2013. Their songs were immediately made available through RAI's official website. Starting from 6 December 2013, live auditions were held in Rome, in front of a commission composed of president Mauro Pagani, Claudio Fasulo, Andrea Guerra, Massimo Martelli and Stefano Senardi. The selected acts and songs—Diodato with "Babilonia", Filippo Graziani with "Le cose belle", Rocco Hunt with "Nu juorno buono", The Niro with "1969", Veronica De Simone with "Nuvole che passano" and Zibba with "Senza di te"—were announced on 13 December 2013.

Big Artists section
The artists competing in the Big Artists section were chosen by RAI through an internal selection. The commission which screened the received songs included all the members of the artistic direction of the show—Fabio Fazio, Claudio Fasulo, Pietro Galeotti, Massimo Martelli, Francesco Piccolo, Stefano Senardi, Michele Serra—and was supervised by Mauro Pagani, musical director of the Sanremo Music Festival 2014. The chosen artists were announced by Fabio Fazio on 18 December 2014, during the 13.30 edition of Italian news-programme TG1. Immediately before reading the names of the 14 acts, Fazio shared a photo of the list through his Twitter account. During the same day, the titles of competing songs were revealed by RAI.

Participants and results summary

Performances, guests and voting details

First night

During the first night, held on 18 February 2014, seven out of fourteen artists competing in the Big Artists section presented their two songs. At the end of the night, a song for each artist was eliminated, as a result of televotes combined with votes given by music journalists. For each competing act, the chosen song was announced by a different presenter.

The night was opened by a monologue by Fazio, which was interrupted by the suicide threat of a man protesting against unemployment and economic conditions in Campania. 
After returning to the show, Fazio paid tribute to Italian singer-songwriter Fabrizio De André, together with his widow, Dori Ghezzi. Luciano Ligabue then performed De André's "Creuza de mä", togher with music director Mauro Pagani.

The second guest of the night was French actress and model Laetitia Casta, who promoted her film Una donna per amica. During a sketch, Fazio performed "Ne me quitte pas" for her, while she sang Domenico Modugno's "Meraviglioso". After performing a choreography based on Alberto Sordi and Monica Vitti's "Ma 'n do'... Hawaii", Casta joined Fazio for a tribute to Italian singer Enzo Jannacci, who ended with the appearance of Enzo's son, Paolo.

After Raphael Gualazzi & The Bloody Beetroots performances, Raffaella Carrà appeared on stage, singing "Fun Fun Fun" and "Cha Cha Ciao". She also dueted with Luciana Littizzetto, performing "Rumore". Carrà also promoted the second season of the talent show The Voice of Italy, in which she appears as a coach.
The last guest of the night was Cat Stevens, who performed "Peace Train", "Maybe There's a World" and a cover of The Beatles' "All You Need Is Love".

Big Artists performances during the first night

Second night
The second night of the contest took place on 19 February 2014. The show was based on the selection of one song for each of the seven acts in the Big Artists section which did not perform during the previous night. Each act performed two entries, among which only one advanced in the competition, as a result of televotes combined with votes given by music journalists. As for the first night, the winning entry was announced by a different guest for each act. 
During the second night, the competition for the Newcomers' section was launched. In the final part of the show, four newcomers  performed their entries and, after receiving votes by journalists and by the public, two of them were eliminated from the competition.

The first musical guest of the night was actor Claudio Santamaria, promoting the fiction Non è mai troppo tardi, based on the story of Italian school teacher Alberto Manzi. The Kessler Twins later appeared on stage, singing and dancing the track "Quelli belli come noi" with co-presenter Luciana Littizzetto.
After Renzo Rubino's performances, Italian actress Franca Valeri acted the part of her character Sora Cesira, and later performed a sketch with Littizzetto.
Italian singer-songwriter Claudio Baglioni was the first musical guest of the night. He performed the songs "Questo piccolo grande amore", "E tu", "Strada facendo", "Avrai", "Mille giorni di te e di me" and "Con voi", and he was also interviewed by Fazio. The international guest of the night was Rufus Wainwright, which appeared onstage at the end of Big Artists competition, before the launch of the performances for the acts of the Newcomers' section. He performed the songs "Cigarettes and Chocolate Milk" and The Beatles' "Across the Universe".

Big Artists performances during the second night

Newcomers' performances during the second night

Third night

Big Artists performances during the third night

During the third night, the selected song of each act competing in the Big Artists section was performed again, and a first ranking was compiled, based on public votes only, with Francesco Renga's "Vivendo adesso" in the first spot. 
At the end of the night, the last four acts of the Newcomers' section performed their entries and, after being voted by journalists and by the public, two of them advanced to the final round of the competition, while the remaining ones were eliminated.

The show started with a tribute to Claudio Abbado, with musicians of the Philharmonic Orchestra of the La Fenice opera house, directed by Diego Matheuz, performing the overture from Mozart's The Marriage of Figaro. Luciana Littizzetto later performed a monologue about beauty and diversity. At the end of her piece, German dancer Dergin Tokmak, which lost the use of his legs as a child, performed an acrobatic dance with his crutches. After a monologue by arts critic Flavio Caroli, the a cappella group Shai Fishman and The A Cappella All Stars made the scene with a fake show interruption, performing a medley of popular international songs. 
Italian showman Renzo Arbore was another guest of the night. He performed his hit "Ma la notte no", from his 1985 TV programme Quelli della notte, and Roberto Murolo's "Reginella" and "Come facette mammeta".
At the end of the performances of the acts competing in the Big Artists section, astronaut Luca Parmitano was interviews by Fazio. Later, Irish singer Damien Rice performed his songs "Cannonball" and "The Blower's Daughter".

Newcomers' performances during the third night

Fourth night

During the fourth night of the contest, each act competing in the Big Artists section performed, together with optional guests, a song from a popular Italian singer-songwriter, as part of the "Sanremo Club" night, an out-of-competition tribute to Italian cantautori. During the night, the final round of the Newcomers' section also took place, with Rocco Hunt placing first with his entry "Nu jurno buono".

The show began with Marco Mengoni performing a cover of Sergio Endrigo's "Io che amo solo te". After five performances of the acts competing in the Big Artists section, Italian illusionist Silvan performed a piece with presenter Luciana Littizzetto. Singer Gino Paoli also took part in the show, performing with pianist Danilo Rea the songs "Vedrai vedrai", Umberto Bindi's "Il nostro concerto", and his popular hit "Il cielo in una stanza". The international guest of the night was Scottish singer Paolo Nutini, who performed a cover of Lucio Dalla's "Caruso", as well as his own songs "Candy" and "Scream (Funk My Life Up)".

Big Artists performances during the fourth night

Newcomers' performances during the fourth night – Final

Fifth night

The final night of the competition was divided in two different rounds. During the first round, the acts in the Big Artists section, except disqualified Riccardo Sinigallia, performed their entries still in competition. A ranking was compiled, based on votes received during the third night, as well as on the public votes received during the final, and on points awarded by the jury. The top-three acts advanced to the last round of the competition, in which public vote and jury votes were combined to compose the final ranking. As a result, Arisa's "Controvento" was announced as the winner of the competition.

The night was opened by Terence Hill, which appeared on stage wearing the clothes of his character Don Matteo, from the television series with same name. Hill performed a sketch with Littizzetto and Fazio, which ended with presenters performing a cover of "Un corpo e un'anima", originally sung by Wess and Dori Ghezzi.
Actor Maurizio Crozza, which received criticism by the public when he appeared as a guest during the previous edition of the contest, appeared on stage pretending to be afraid of the public's reaction, and later performed a monologue inspired by the show's main theme, beauty. At the end of his performance, he impersonated Italian Prime Minister Matteo Renzi. Luciano Ligabue appeared as a guest for the second time, after opening the first episode. He performed his songs "Certe notti", "Il giorno di dolore che uno ha", "Il sale della terra" and "Per sempre".
After being interviewed by Fazio, actress Claudia Cardinale announced the winners of the Critic's Award "Mia Martini" and of the TV, Radio and TV award "Lucio Dalla"—Cristiano De André's "Invisibili" and Perturbazione's "L'unica", respectively.
Despite being disqualified from the competition, Riccardo Sinigallia was allowed to perform his entry "Prima di andare via", at the end of the first round of the final. Before the performances of the last round of the competition, all the eight acts of the Newcomers' section were allowed to sing a reduced version of their entries.

Big Artists performances during the fifth night – Round 1

Big Artists performances during the fifth night – Final round

Other awards

Critics' Award "Mia Martini" – Big Artists section

Critics' Award "Mia Martini" – Newcomers' section

Press, Radio & TV Award "Lucio Dalla" – Big Artists section

Press, Radio & TV Award "Lucio Dalla" – Newcomers' section

Ratings

Notes
A  Riccardo Sinigallia's entry "Prima di andare via" was disqualified from the competition after it was revealed the song had been performed by Sinigallia himself during a concert in the months preceding the show, breaking the rules of the Festival, which don't allow competing songs to be released or publicly performed before the beginning of the Festival itself. Sinigallia ranked tenth during the second night but, after his disqualification, RAI considered invalid the votes he received and did not reveal the percentage of public votes he received during the night.
B  The jury voting during the final for the Newcomers' section and for the Big Artists section was composed of: Paolo Virzì (president), Silvia Avallone, Paolo Jannacci, Piero Maranghi, Aldo Nove, Lucia Ocone, Silvio Orlando, Giorgia Surina, Rocco Tanica and Anna Tifu.

References

External links
 Sanremo Music Festival (official website)

Sanremo Music Festival by year
2014 in Italian television
2014 song contests
2014 in Italian music